Susanne Scharras (born 11 February 1965) is a German former footballer who played as a defender. She made four appearances for the Germany women's national team.

Career
Scharras made her international debut for Germany in a friendly on 2 May 1984, starting against Norway before being substituted out at half-time. The match finished as a 4–1 loss for Germany. She earned her final cap on 4 September 1987, coming on as a substitute in the 50th minute for Sissy Raith against Iceland, with the friendly mtach finishing as a 5–0 win for Germany.

Career statistics

International

References

External links
 
 

1965 births
Living people
People from Staufen im Breisgau
Sportspeople from Freiburg (region)
Footballers from Baden-Württemberg
German women's footballers
Germany women's international footballers
Women's association football defenders